Rubidium hydrogen sulfate, sometimes referred to as rubidium bisulfate, is the half neutralized rubidium salt of sulfuric acid. It has the formula RbHSO4.

Synthesis
It may be synthesised with water and a stoichiometric amount of rubidium disulfate. Reaction takes place where there is no humidity:

{Rb2S2O7} + H2O -> 2RbHSO_4

There is another method of creation. It is similar to the synthesis of sodium sulfate and potassium sulfate. This reaction requires rubidium chloride and a little bit of warm sulfuric acid. Some hydrogen chloride is also produced during the reaction.

{H2SO4} + RbCl -> {RbHSO4} + HCl

Properties
It is a hygroscopic compound. It has a monoclinic crystal structure, its structure is  P21/n. Dimensions of the unit cell are: a = 1440 pm, b = 462.2 pm, c = 1436 pm and β = 118.0°. Its crystals are isomorphs with ammonium hydrogen sulfate crystals.

Its standard enthalpy is  −1166 kJ/mol. During its dissolution in water, there is 15.62 kJ/mol energy produced.

After warming up it decomposes to rubidium disulfate and water:

2RbHSO4 -> Rb2S2O7 + H2O

Like potassium and caesium, rubidium has another hydrogen sulfate compound as well: Rb3H(SO4)2.

References

Rubidium compounds